Shevill is a surname. Notable people with the surname include:

 Essie Shevill (1908–1989), Australian cricketer
 Ian Shevill (1917–1988), Australian Anglican bishop
 Rene Shevill (1910–1974), Australian cricketer, sister of Essie